The Volkswagen Bio Runner is a concept car presented by Volkswagen at the October 2008 LA Design Challenge. It is powered by dual turbine engines at 500,000 rpm. bio synthetic jet fuel.

It uses video support of Arial Reconnaissance Drone (AR-D) when visibility is limited for a driver. It also may be transported by a Support Team Chopper.

The Volkswagen Bio Runner was designed for a future 2025 Baja 1000 race for a recommended "One Tank Unlimited Solo" race.  A race that required the driver to only carry one 10-gallon tank and drive solo.

References

External links 
 Volkswagen Bio Runner at Volkswagen/Audi Design Center California (Design Challenge Motorsports 2025, LA Auto Show)
 Volkswagen Bio Runner at autoblog.com
 VW Bio Runner sprints in, Mark Nichol - 22 Oct 2008, Car Enthusiast editorial agency
 Volkswagen Bio Runner Concept - LA Design Challenge 2008 at dieselstation.com
 Volkswagen Bio Runner, at Diseno-art.com

Cars introduced in 2008
Bio Runner